Qassersuit Saqqaa is a strait of Greenland. It is located in the Upernavik Archipelago.

Straits of the Upernavik Archipelago